Beatriz Mojica Morga (born 25 February 1973) is a Mexican politician affiliated with the Party of the Democratic Revolution. As of 2014 she served as Deputy of the LIX Legislature of the Mexican Congress as a plurinominal representative.

References

1973 births
Living people
Politicians from Guerrero
Women members of the Chamber of Deputies (Mexico)
Members of the Chamber of Deputies (Mexico)
Party of the Democratic Revolution politicians
21st-century Mexican politicians
21st-century Mexican women politicians
People from Ciudad Altamirano, Guerrero
Deputies of the LIX Legislature of Mexico